Famous Ecuadorian painters include:

Alfredo Palacio Moreno (1912-1998)
Aníbal Villacís (1927–present)
Araceli Gilbert (1913-1993)
Brenda Gonzalez 
Caesar Andrade Faini (1913–present)
Camilo Egas (1889-1962)
Edgar Carrasco Arteaga (1946–present) 
Eduardo Kingman (1913-1998)
Eduardo X Arroyo (1953–present)
Enrique Tábara (1930–present)
Estuardo Maldonado (1930–present)
Félix Arauz (1935–present)
Galo Galecio
Gilberto Almeida
Gonzalo Endara Crow (1936-1996)
Jaime Valencia (1915–present)
Jorge Velarde (1960–present)
Jose Carreño (1947–present)
Jovan Karlo Villalba (1977–present)
Juan Villafuerte (1945-1977)
Judith Gutierrez (1927-2003)
Luis Miranda (1932-2016)
Luis Molinari-Flores (1929–present)
Manuel Rendón (1894-1982)
Marcos Restrepo (1961–present)
Miguel Betancourt (1958–present) 
Oswaldo Guayasamín (1919-1999)
Oswaldo Moncayo (1923-1984)
Oswaldo Moreno (1929-2011)
Oswaldo Viteri (1931–present)
Patricio Cueva Jaramillo (1928–present)
Rafael Salas (1824-1906)
Theo Constanté (1934–present)
Trude Sojka (1909-2007)
Washington Iza (1947–present)
Xavier Blum Pinto (1957–present)

References

 
Ecuadorian